Goa is divided into 2 districts: North Goa and South Goa, which are further divided into 12 talukas.

Tehsils/talukas present in North Goa:

 Bardez
 Bicholim
 Pernem
 Sattari
 Tiswadi
 Ponda

Tehsils/talukas present in South Goa:

 Canacona
 Mormugao
 Salcette
 Sanguem
 Quepem
 Dharbandora

See also
 Districts of Goa

References

 
Goa
Talukas